America This Morning is an American early morning news program, broadcast on ABC on weekday mornings. The newscast is anchored by Andrew Dymburt and Rhiannon Ally, who also serve as anchors of ABC's overnight news program World News Now. One of the two early morning news programs to use a two-anchor format, alongside NBC's Early Today (the CBS Morning News maintains a solo anchor), it usually airs following World News Now. It features national and international news headlines, live reports from Washington, D.C., national weather and airport impact forecasts, a short SportsCenter update from the late night Los Angeles-based anchors of the ESPN show to account for West Coast scores, and a regular business news segment called "America's Money".

The program is broadcast live at 3:30 a.m. Eastern Time Zone following World News Now (airing in the early timeslot to accommodate ABC stations that start their morning local newscasts at 4:00 a.m.). ABC-owned WPVI-TV was one of the first stations to air local news starting at 4:00 a.m. beginning in September 2018. The show is transmitted in a continuous half-hour tape delayed loop until 10:00 a.m. Eastern Time, when Good Morning America begins in the Pacific Time Zone (after 7:00 a.m. Eastern Time, any live breaking news requiring network-level coverage is under the purview of GMA with some allowance to start earlier). The program usually airs as a lead-in to local morning newscasts on most ABC stations, although in the few markets where a morning newscast is not produced by the ABC station, it may air in a two- to three-hour loop immediately before the start of GMA.

History
The program originally debuted under the title ABC News This Morning on July 5, 1982. In early 1983, the program was retitled ABC World News This Morning. The program aired live at 6:00 a.m. Eastern Time for 60 minutes immediately prior to Good Morning America and was repeated on tape delay for western time zones. It was initially anchored by Steve Bell and Kathleen Sullivan at the network's Washington, D.C. newsroom-studio (as was most ABC News programming at the time). Production of the program was moved to ABC's headquarters in the Lincoln Square, Manhattan district of New York City on July 11, 1988, when Forrest Sawyer and Paula Zahn debuted as co-anchors.

In mid-1992, production of World News This Morning was combined with that of the network's then recently launched overnight news program World News Now, with the same anchor team appearing on both programs. Initially, some elements from World News Now were brought over to World News This Morning including the "Morning Papers" segment and that program's Yanni-composed theme music (played over the original World News This Morning opening graphics) as well as the laid-back attitude.

At some point in 1993, the original Score Productions-composed theme was brought back and most elements from World News Now brought over to World News This Morning were dropped as the program was reformatted to again became more serious in tone. As local stations expanded their morning newscasts, World News This Morning was first shortened into two separate 30-minute newscasts and later to the current, single, 30-minute newscast (which, if an affiliate does not provide a morning news program of its own, can be repeated back-to-back between 4:00 and 7:00 a.m. Eastern Time). From the cable network's launch in 1996 until almost all original programming was discontinued due to cost-cutting measures made by ESPN on June 13, 2013, the program's sports update was provided by the overnight anchors of ESPNews, and later on, the Highlight Express; later that year, production of the sports segments was turned over to the Los Angeles-based production and anchor staff for the overnight editions of ESPN's SportsCenter.

The news program celebrated its 20th anniversary during the summer of 2002. On November 13, 2006, the program's title was changed again to America This Morning; with the rebranding, the orchestral theme from Score Productions that had been used since the program's launch (outside of the short period when it was replaced by World News Nows original theme music) was retired permanently, and replaced with a modernized theme – along with a new graphics package – the program's on-air appearance had previously been styled after that used by WNN and ABC World News Tonight.

Since the program adopted its current title, although it has remained under the same production as World News Now, America This Morning has gradually been integrated with Good Morning America branding-wise (in effect, retooling it as a complementary program to GMA); the program's current title logo is designed similarly to the logo Good Morning America began using two months prior to the title change, and it eventually adopted that program's graphics package and theme music (composed by DreamArtists Studios) in 2013. On September 22, 2009, America This Morning and World News Now began broadcasting in high definition; America This Morning, in effect, became the second early morning network newscast to broadcast in HD, after NBC's Early Today.

On August 30, 2010, ABC moved its live broadcast of the program to 4:00 a.m. Eastern Time Zone (like its competitors Early Today and the CBS Morning News had already done) to accommodate affiliates that choose to start their morning local newscasts at 4:30 a.m. ET. Some ABC stations (Such as WTVC in Chattanooga, Tennessee) were forced to pre-empt the program when they implemented it less than two months earlier.

As of September 10, 2018, many of ABC's owned and operated stations have begun their morning newscasts at 4:00 a.m. Eastern Time Zone, initially pre-empting America This Morning in these regions before ATM later began broadcasting live at 3:30 a.m. Eastern Time to accommodate.

Newscast structure

Notable on-air staff

Current anchors
 Andrew Dymburt (2021–present)
 Rhiannon Ally (2022–present)

Former anchors

 Steve Bell (1982–1986)
 Kathleen Sullivan (1982–1986)
 Jeanne Meserve (1986–1987)
 Jed Duvall (1987–1988)
 Edie Magnus (1987–1988)
 Forrest Sawyer (1988–1989)
 Paula Zahn (1988–1990)
 Mike Schneider (1989–1993)
 Aaron Brown (1993)
 Boyd Matson (1993–1994)
 Thalia Assuras (1993–1997)
 Kevin Newman (1995–1996)
 Mark Mullen (1997–1998)
 Asha Blake (1997–1998)
 Juju Chang (1999–2000)
 Antonio Mora (late 1990s)
 Derek McGinty (2000–2003)
 Alison Stewart
 Liz Cho (1999–2003) now at WABC-TV in New York City)
 David Muir (2003–2004)
 Hari Sreenivasan (2006–2007; later with PBS NewsHour)
 Ryan Owens (2007–2008)
 Jeremy Hubbard (2008–2010; now at KDVR in Denver)
 Vinita Nair (2008–2011; now with NBC News)
 Rob Nelson (main co-anchor, 2010–2013; substitute anchor, 2013–2018)
 Paula Faris (2012–2013)
 John Muller (2013–2014; now with WPIX in New York City)
 T. J. Holmes (2014–2015)
 Reena Ninan (2014–2016; now with CBS News)
 Diane Macedo (2016–2018)
 Kendis Gibson (2016–2019; now with WFOR-TV in Miami)
 Janai Norman (2018–2020)
 Kenneth Moton (2019–2021)
 Mona Kosar Abdi (2020–2022)

Announcers
World News/America This Morning has had three announcers in its history. From its 1982 debut until 1990, Bill Owen served as the program's announcer. Following Owen's departure from the network in 1990, he was replaced by Barbara Daniels Korsen, who remained the newscast's announcer until 2012.

International broadcasts
Programming from ABC News, including America This Morning, is shown daily on the 24-hour news network OSN News in MENA Region.

See also
 CBS Morning News – Competing early-morning news program on CBS, which debuted in 1982 in its current format.
 Early Today – Competing early-morning news program on NBC, which debuted in 1999.
 Up to the Minute – Competing overnight news program on CBS, which debuted in 1992.
 World News Now – ABC's overnight news program, which debuted in 1992 and shares production staff with America This Morning.

References

External links

 

1980s American television news shows
1982 American television series debuts
1990s American television news shows
2000s American television news shows
2010s American television news shows
2020s American television news shows
ABC News
American Broadcasting Company original programming
English-language television shows
Television shows filmed in New York City